Nulls Creek is a stream in Lincoln County in the U.S. state of Missouri. The stream is a tributary of the North Fork of the Cuivre River.

The stream headwaters arise at  just south of Missouri Route PP and one mile east of the community of Corso at an elevation of approximately 675 feet.

Nulls Creek has the name of Jacob Null, a pioneer settler.

See also
List of rivers of Missouri

References

Rivers of Lincoln County, Missouri
Rivers of Missouri